Church of the Blessed Virgin Mary, the Queen of Peace is a historic Roman Catholic church on FM 340 in Sweet Home, Texas. It is dedicated to Blessed Virgin Mary, the Queen of Peace.

It was built in 1918 and added to the National Register in 1983.

See also

National Register of Historic Places listings in Lavaca County, Texas

References

Roman Catholic churches in Texas
Churches on the National Register of Historic Places in Texas
Roman Catholic churches completed in 1918
20th-century Roman Catholic church buildings in the United States
Churches in Lavaca County, Texas
National Register of Historic Places in Lavaca County, Texas